Cor-Bon/Glaser LLC is a manufacturer of small arms ammunition.

History
Founded in Sturgis, South Dakota, Cor-Bon/Glaser Ammunition originated when Peter Pi Sr. started making handgun hunting ammo in 1982 because the commonly available ammunition at that time was performing poorly.  Pi noticed that hollow point ammunition would not expand and went about creating a line of ammunition with reliable expansion.

In 2017 the Company was sold to TA Perrine and moved to Wooster, OH.

In 2021 the company was sold again to an investment group out of Sandusky, OH,

CorBon Law Enforcement Training Center

On June 23, 2011 the company opened the CorBon Law Enforcement Training Center (CLETC) in Sturgis, South Dakota. The center has several shooting ranges to train law enforcement officers. CLETC closed in 2015 due to a lack of business.

Product Lines

Cor-bon produces several product lines of ammunition:
Original JHP
DPX 
Performance Match
Urban Response
Hunting Lines
Multi-Purpose Rifle
Subsonic Ammo

Glaser Safety Slug has several product lines:
Powerball
Safety Slug Blue
Safety Slug Silver

Note: Some of these products produce Plus P pressures. Do not use in your firearms unless you know for certain it is Plus P capable!

Original Products
Cor-Bon designed and developed the .32 NAA, essentially a .380 ACP case necked-down to a .32 caliber bullet, and the NAA Guardian .32 NAA pocket pistol in partnership with North American Arms (NAA). At the 2004 SHOT Show, Cor-Bon and NAA introduced their jointly developed .25 NAA.

.400 Cor-Bon is a Cor-Bon cartridge that was developed in 1997. In the same manner as the .32 NAA, it was based on a .45 ACP case necked-down to .40.

References

General

External links 
 

Ammunition manufacturers
Defunct manufacturing companies based in South Dakota
Privately held companies based in South Dakota
Cartridge families
American companies established in 1982
1982 establishments in South Dakota
 
Manufacturing companies established in 1982